Digitivalva granitella is a moth of the family Acrolepiidae. It is found in most of Continental Europe, except Fennoscandia, the Netherlands, Portugal, the Baltic region, the western part of the Balkan Peninsula and Ukraine.

The wingspan is 11–14 mm. Adults are on wing from June to July and again from August to September in two generations per year. The adult overwinters and reappears the following spring.

The larvae feed on Inula conyza. They mine the leaves of their host plant. The mine has the form a long and narrow corridor that starts at the midrib or at the leaf base. Later, it becomes a large, full depth blotch nearly without any frass.  A larva may vacate the mine and restart elsewhere. A second mine has no initial corridor.  Pupation takes place outside of the mine. Larvae can be found from April to May and again from June to July.

References

Acrolepiidae
Moths described in 1833
Moths of Europe